Kiya Abu'l-Fawaris Shahriyar ibn Abbas ibn Shahriyar, better simply known as Shahriyar ibn Abbas was a Bavandid prince, who is solely known for being mentioned in the inscription on the mausoleum in Savadkuh, known as the Lajim Tower. The mausoleum was constructed in 1022, where he was most already likely dead. The person who ordered the construction was his mother Chihrazad, whilst the name of the architect was a certain al-Husayn ibn Ali. In the inscription, Shahriyar is labeled as "Client of the Commander of the Faithful" (mawlā amīr al-muʾminīn). However, he is not called ispahbad, which was the title used by the Bavandid rulers, and thus it is dubious if he ever ruled.

Shahriyar was possibly a grandson of the Bavandid ruler Shahriyar III (r. 986-988), and may have been the Shahriyar that the prominent Persian poet and author of Shahnameh ("Book of Kings"), Ferdowsi visited in 1010/1.

Notes

References

Sources 
 
 

Bavand dynasty
11th-century Iranian people
11th-century deaths
Year of birth missing